The 1990–91 season  was Heart of Midlothian F.C.s  8th consecutive season of play in the Scottish Premier Division. Hearts also competed in the Scottish Cup & the Scottish League Cup.

Managers
Hearts had two managers over the course of the season. They started under the stewardship of Alex MacDonald however he was sacked in September 1990 and replaced by Joe Jordan.

Fixtures

Friendlies

Uefa Cup

League Cup

Scottish Cup

Scottish Premier Division

Scottish Premier Division table

Stats

Squad information

|}

Scorers

See also
List of Heart of Midlothian F.C. seasons

References

1990-91

External links
Official Club website

Heart of Midlothian F.C. seasons
Heart of Midlothian